Petrushi is a rural locality (a selo) and the administrative center of Petrushinsky Selsoviet of Shimanovsky District, Amur Oblast, Russia. The population was 404 as of 2018. There are 3 streets.

Geography 
Petrushi is located 10 km north of Shimanovsk (the district's administrative centre) by road. Shimanovsk is the nearest rural locality.

References 

Rural localities in Shimanovsky District